Emilio Villa (born 13 January 1953) is a Colombian boxer. He competed in the men's light welterweight event at the 1972 Summer Olympics.

References

External links
 
 

1953 births
Living people
Colombian male boxers
Olympic boxers of Colombia
Boxers at the 1972 Summer Olympics
Sportspeople from Barranquilla
Light-welterweight boxers
20th-century Colombian people